Narzana is one of three parishes in Sariego, a municipality within the province and autonomous community of Asturias, in northern Spain.

The principal monument is the Church of Santa María de Narzana, constructed in a Romanesque style.

Villages
 Aramanti
 Barbechu
 Canal
 Castañera
 Miares
 La Rimá
 Villar

References 

Parishes in Sariego